Yanzhuang is a town in Gangcheng District, Jinan, in central Shandong province, China.

References

Township-level divisions of Shandong